Korarx (also, Kerarkh and Korarkh) is a village and municipality in the Agdash Rayon of Azerbaijan.  It has a population of 586.

References 

Populated places in Agdash District